The som (Kyrgyz: сом; ISO code: KGS; sign: с) is the currency of Kyrgyzstan.

Etymology

The official name of the Soviet currency in Kazakh, Kyrgyz, Tajik, and Uzbek was soum, and this name appeared written on the back of banknotes, among the texts for the value of the note in all 15 official languages of the USSR. The word som (alternatively transliterated "soum" or "sum") means "pure" in Kazakh, Kyrgyz, Uyghur and Uzbek, as well as in many other Turkic languages. The word implies "pure" silver or gold and thus is similar in etymology to sterling.

Currency symbol

The National Bank of the Kyrgyz Republic approved an underlined С (es) as the official currency symbol for the som in February 2017.

History
After the collapse of the Soviet Union attempts were made by most republics to maintain a common currency. 
Certain politicians were hoping to at the very least maintain "special relations" among former Soviet republics, or the "near abroad". Another reason were the economic considerations for maintaining the rouble zone. The wish to preserve the strong trade relations between former Soviet republics was considered the most important goal.

The break-up of the Soviet Union was not accompanied by any formal changes in monetary arrangements. The Central Bank of Russia was authorized to take over the State Bank of the USSR (Gosbank) on 1 January 1992. It continued to ship Soviet notes and coins to the central banks of the fourteen newly independent countries, which had formerly been the main branches of Gosbank in the republics.
The political situation, however, was not favourable for maintaining a common currency. Maintaining a common currency requires a strong political consensus in respect to monetary and fiscal targets, a common institution in charge of implementing these targets, and some minimum of common legislation (concerning the banking and foreign exchange regulations). These conditions were far from being met amidst the turbulent economic and political situation.

During the first half of 1992, a monetary union with 15 independent states all using the rouble existed. Since it was clear that the situation would not last, each of them was using its position as "free-riders" to issue huge amounts of money in the form of credit. As a result, some countries were issuing coupons in order to "protect" their markets from buyers from other states. The Russian central bank responded in July 1992 by setting up restrictions to the flow of credit between Russia and other states. The final collapse of the rouble zone began when Russia pulled out with the exchange of banknotes by the Central Bank of Russia on Russian territory at the end of July 1993.

The Kyrgyz som was introduced on May 10, 1993, replacing the Soviet currency at a rate of 1 som = Rbls 200. Initially only banknotes were issued, coins were not introduced until 2008.

Coins
Circulation coins were first introduced in January 2008, making Kyrgyzstan second to last of the former Soviet republics to issue them. Belarus became the last.   This move came with growing demand from vendors for coins, especially from slot machine industries and those desiring a more efficient system for collecting fare money.

The coins were issued in denominations of 10 and 50 tiyin and 1, 3, and 5 som. A 10 som coin was issued a year later in 2009.

All coins are minted by the Kazakhstan mint in Ust-Kamenogorsk and bear some resemblance to coins of the Russian Federation.

Commemorative coins

There are several commemorative non circulation coins struck in silver and gold, and a special collector's 1 tyiyn piece struck in brass.
Starting in 1995, the National Bank of the Kyrgyz Republic has issued a large number of commemorative coins intended for collectors. They are not used in everyday circulation.

Banknotes
On 10 May 1993, the government issued 1, 10, and 50 tyiyn notes and the Kyrgyzstan Bank issued notes for 1, 5, and 20 som. 
In 1994, the Kyrgyz Bank issued a second series of notes in denominations of 1, 5, 10, 20, 50, and 100 som. 
A third series followed from 1997 onwards in denominations of 1, 5, 10, 20, 50, 100, 200, 500, and 1,000 som. 
A fourth series was issued in 2009 and 2010 in denominations of 20, 50, 100, 200, 500, 1,000, and 5,000 som. Several commemorative banknotes intended for collectors were also issued.

First series (1993)
Notes valued 1 and 10 tyiyin with serial numbers KT and ZT were issued in 1999. 
50 tyiyins notes with serial numbers KT and ZT were issued in 2001. All others in 1993.

Notes of the first series were designed by Dmitry Lysogorov and A. P. Tsygank.
They were printed by De La Rue in Great Britain.

Notes valued 1, 10, and 50 tyiyin stayed in use until coins were introduced in January 2008. Banknotes of 1, 5, and 20 som of the first series were gradually withdrawn from circulation and replaced with banknotes of the second series starting in 1994.

Second series (1994–1995)
The second series of banknotes followed in 1994-1995 when "the banknotes of the stabilization period" were issued. These banknotes had a better counterfeit protection than the banknotes of the first series.

Third series (1997–2005) 
Starting in 1997, a new series of banknotes was introduced with similar themes, but enhanced design, compared to the previous series.

In January 2008 coins of 1 and 5 som and in December 2009 coins of 10 som were introduced. As a result, production of banknotes of these values ceased. The banknotes were however not removed from circulation, but are instead being phased out. In January 2008 the Kyrgyz National Bank estimated that within 2 years the 1 and 5 som banknotes would have almost completely disappeared from circulation.

Fourth series (2009–2016) 
In 2009 the National Bank of the Kyrgyz Republic issued a 5,000 som note. Later new editions for 20, 50, and 100 som denominations followed. Among other things, these notes have enhanced security features compared to the previous series.

Commemorative banknotes
In October 2014 banknotes commemorating the 150th birthdate of Toktogul Satylganov and the 100th birthdate of Alykul Osmonov were issued for sale to collectors. Only 3,000 of each were printed.

A commemorative 2,000 som banknote in honor of the 25th anniversary of independence and the introduction of the som was issued in November 2017.

Exchange rates

See also

 Economy of Kyrgyzstan
 Uzbekistani sum

References

External links
 Biographies of the figures depicted on Kyrgyz bank notes from the Spektator magazine
 

Economy of Kyrgyzstan
Currencies introduced in 1993